The 72nd New York State Legislature, consisting of the New York State Senate and the New York State Assembly, met from January 2 to April 11, 1849, during the first year of Hamilton Fish's governorship, in Albany.

Background
Under the provisions of the New York Constitution of 1846, 32 Senators were elected in single-seat senatorial districts for a two-year term, the whole Senate being renewed biennially. The senatorial districts (except those in New York City) were made up of entire counties. 128 Assemblymen were elected in single-seat districts to a one-year term, the whole Assembly being renewed annually. The Assembly districts were made up of entire towns, or city wards, forming a contiguous area, all in the same county. The City and County of New York was divided into four senatorial districts, and 16 Assembly districts.

State Senator Allen Ayrault resigned on June 2, 1848, leaving a vacancy in the 29th District.

At this time there were two major political parties: the Democratic Party and the Whig Party. The Democratic Party was split into two factions: the "Barnburners" and the "Hunkers." The Barnburners walked out of the 1848 Democratic state convention and formed with a small faction of anti-slavery Whigs and a part of the Liberty Party the Free Soil Party. The uncompromising radical abolitionists ran their own tickets as the Liberty Party.

Elections
The New York state election, 1848 was held on November 7.

Whigs Hamilton Fish and George W. Patterson were elected Governor and Lieutenant Governor; and the other two statewide elective offices were also carried by the Whigs.

State Comptroller Millard Fillmore was elected United States Vice President.

106 Whigs, 15 Free Soilers and 7 Hunkers were elected to the State Assembly. One Whig was elected to fill the vacancy in the State Senate.

Sessions
The Legislature met for the regular session at the Old State Capitol in Albany on January 2, 1849; and adjourned on April 11.

Amos K. Hadley (W) was re-elected Speaker with 101 votes against 13 for Frederick P. Bellinger (Barnb.) and 6 for Charles C. Noble (Hunker).

On January 31, State Comptroller Millard Fillmore sent a letter to the Legislature, resigning the office, to take effect on February 20.

On February 6, the Legislature elected William H. Seward (W) to succeed John A. Dix (Barnb.) as U.S. Senator, for a six-year term beginning on March 4, 1849.

On February 17, the Legislature elected Washington Hunt (W) to succeed Millard Fillmore as State Comptroller on February 20.

On April 11, Samuel J. Wilkin was elected president pro tempore of the State Senate.

State Senate

Districts

 1st District: Queens, Richmond and Suffolk counties
 2nd District: Kings County
 3rd District: 1st, 2nd, 3rd, 4th, 5th and 6th wards of New York City
 4th District: 7th, 10th, 13th and 17th wards of New York City
 5th District: 8th, 9th and 14th wards of New York City
 6th District: 11th, 12th, 15th, 16th, 18th, 19th, 20th, 21st and 22nd wards of New York City
 7th District: Putnam,  Rockland and Westchester counties
 8th District: Columbia and Dutchess counties
 9th District: Orange and Sullivan counties
 10th District: Greene and Ulster counties
 11th District: Albany and Schenectady counties
 12th District: Rensselaer County
 13th District: Saratoga and Washington counties
 14th District: Clinton, Essex and Warren counties
 15th District: Franklin and St. Lawrence counties
 16th District: Fulton, Hamilton, Herkimer and Montgomery counties
 17th District: Delaware and Schoharie counties
 18th District: Chenango and Otsego counties
 19th District: Oneida County
 20th District: Madison and Oswego counties
 21st District: Jefferson and Lewis counties
 22nd District: Onondaga County
 23rd District: Broome, Cortland and Tioga counties
 24th District: Cayuga and Wayne counties
 25th District: Seneca, Tompkins and Yates counties
 26th District: Chemung and Steuben counties
 27th District: Monroe County
 28th District: Genesee, Niagara and Orleans counties
 29th District: Livingston and Ontario counties
 30th District: Allegany and Wyoming counties
 31st District: Erie County
 32nd District: Cattaraugus and Chautauqua counties

Note: There are now 62 counties in the State of New York. The counties which are not mentioned in this list had not yet been established, or sufficiently organized, the area being included in one or more of the abovementioned counties.

Members
The asterisk (*) denotes members of the previous Legislature who continued in office as members of this Legislature.

Employees
 Clerk: Andrew H. Calhoun

State Assembly

Assemblymen
The asterisk (*) denotes members of the previous Legislature who continued as members of this Legislature.

Party affiliations follow the vote on Speaker, U.S. Senator and USNY Regent.

Employees
 Clerk: Philander B. Prindle
 Sergeant-at-Arms: Samuel S. Blanchard
 Doorkeeper: Robert Grant
 Assistant Doorkeeper: Thomas E. Osborn
 Second Assistant Doorkeeper: Samuel Merclean

Notes

Sources
 The New York Civil List compiled by Franklin Benjamin Hough (Weed, Parsons and Co., 1858) [pg. 109 for Senate districts; pg. 136 for senators; pg. 148–157 for Assembly districts; pg. 234ff for assemblymen]
 Journal of the Senate (72nd Session) (1849)

072
1849 in New York (state)
1849 U.S. legislative sessions